This page includes the discography of the Serbian duo K2.

Albums

Studio albums

Compilation albums

Singles

Music videos

 1994 - "Ajmo u život"
 1995 - "Džangl Manija"
 1995 - "Milo moje"
 1995 - "Dabadamdam"
 1996 - "Sestre"
 1996 - "Biću tvoja devojka"
 1997 - "Srebro i zlato"

External links
K2 on Discogs

Discographies of Serbian artists
Pop music discographies